Shaun O'Brien may refer to:
 Shaun O'Brien (cyclist)
 Shaun O'Brien (hurler)

See also
 Sean O'Brien (disambiguation)